The 2006 Kansas Jayhawks football team represented the University of Kansas during the 2006 NCAA Division I FBS football season. They participated as members of the Big 12 Conference in the North Division. The team played their home games at Memorial Stadium in Lawrence, Kansas. They were coached by Mark Mangino.  Despite winning 6 games, the team was not invited to a bowl game.

Schedule

References

Kansas
Kansas Jayhawks football seasons
Kansas Jayhawks football